The Yellow Ticket or Earth in Captivity is a 1928 Soviet silent drama film directed by Fyodor Otsep and starring Anna Sten, Ivan Koval-Samborsky and Mikhail Narokov.

Cast
 Anna Sten as Maria, young farmer's wife  
 Ivan Koval-Samborsky as Jacob  
 Mikhail Narokov as Belskiy  
 Vladimir Fogel as Baron's son-in-law  
 Anel Sudakevich as Anya – Baron's married daughter  
 Sofya Yakovleva as Katarina  
 Pyotr Baksheyev as Doorman, butler 
 Nikolai Batalov as Maria's fellow villager  
 Ivan Chuvelyov 
 Konstantin Gradopolov 
 Sofya Levitina 
 Vera Maretskaya as Prostitute  
 Porfiri Podobed

References

Bibliography 
 Phillips, Alastair & Vincendeau, Ginette. Journeys of Desire: European Actors in Hollywood. British Film Institute, 2006.

External links 
 

Films directed by Fedor Ozep
1928 films
Soviet silent feature films
1920s Russian-language films
Soviet black-and-white films
Soviet drama films
1928 drama films
Silent drama films